Alejandra Matus Acuña is a Chilean journalist and writer. In 1999 she published El libro negro de la justicia chilena (lit. "The Black Book of Chilean Justice"). The available copies of the book were confiscated one day before the planned release and Matus was accused by Servando Jordán, minister of the Supreme Court of Chile, of the delict of "desacato" ("contempt") invoking the article 6-B of the Ley de Seguridad del Estado (State Security Law). This prompted Matus to apply for—and receive—political asylum in the United States. The case led to the "desacato" article to be removed from the law with the new Ley de Prensa (Press Law) that was signed on May 25 of 2001 which allowed Matus to return to Chile. Despite the new law the book continued to be banned until October 2001 when the Corte de Apelaciones (Appellate Court) removed the ban.

In 2013 she published the book Doña Lucía, a biography about Lucía Hiriart.

References

Investigative journalists
Chilean women writers
Chilean biographers
Chilean journalists
Chilean exiles
Living people
1966 births
Women biographers